Porter Middle School may refer to a number of middle schools:

 Porter Middle School, Missoula, Montana, part of Missoula Elementary School District
 George K. Porter Middle School, Granada Hills, California, part of Los Angeles Unified School District
 Lewiston Porter Middle School, part of Lewiston-Porter Central School District

See also 
 Porter High School

 George K Porter has the Trojan as a mascot.

References